The Australian Shield is a geological feature known as a shield that occupies more than half of the continent of Australia. The word shield is used because it refers to ancient, molten rock which has cooled and solidified.

In places younger sedimentary rock covers the shield's Precambrian surface.

Extent
It occupies the portion of Australia west of a line running north–south roughly from the eastern shore of Arnhem Land on the Bay or Gulf of Carpentaria to the Eyre Peninsula in the state of South Australia, and skirting to the west of the Simpson Desert in the interior. The geological region called the Western Australian Shield is a western part of the Australian Shield. The Australian Shield is fractured into a number of distinct blocks, including two cratons - the Pilbara Craton in the North and the Yilgarn Craton in the Southwest. These two cratons are the oldest part of the shield, both of which have been dated at more than 2.3 billion years old. Some of these blocks have been raised to form uplands; others have been depressed, forming lowlands and basins. The lowlands include the Great Sandy Desert, the Gibson Desert, the Great Victoria Desert and the Nullarbor Plain, which are located in the north-western, central, southern and south-eastern shield areas respectively. The Nullarbor (from Latin, “no trees”) is an arid, virtually uninhabited limestone plateau. Between the Western Australian Shield and the Great Dividing Range is the Great Artesian Basin region.

The uplands include, in Western Australia, the Hamersley and Wunaamin-Miliwundi ranges in the western and north-western coastal areas and the Darling Range inland from Perth in the far south-west. The MacDonnell Ranges lie in the southern part of the Northern Territory and the Stuart and Musgrave Ranges are located in the north of the state of South Australia. Erosion and weathering have created striking, isolated rock formations called mesas or buttes in many parts of the shield, including the Kimberleys and Pilbara districts of Western Australia and Arnhem Land in the Northern Territory.

See also

Features

Terminology

Notes

References
 Hughes, F. E. (1990) "Chapter 3: Proterozoic Orogenic Domains and PreCambrian Cover Sequences of Western Australia" Geology of the mineral deposits of Australia and Papua New Guinea: Volume 1 Australasian Institute of Mining and Metallurgy, Parkville, Victoria, Australia, pages 605–676, 

Cratons
Historical geology
Geology of Australia
Physiographic divisions
Plateaus of Australia